The men's 400 metre freestyle event at the 2000 Summer Olympics took place on 16 September at the Sydney International Aquatic Centre in Sydney, Australia.

At only 17 years of age, Australia's overwhelming favorite Ian Thorpe, dubbed by his fans as the "Thorpedo", made his Olympic debut by claiming the first gold medal for the host nation at these Games. Cheered by a massive home crowd and rocketed to the chants of "Thorpie" by his swimming fans, Thorpe maintained a strong lead from start to finish before hitting the wall first in a new world record of 3:40.59.

Massimiliano Rosolino earned a silver medal for Italy in a European record of 3:43.40, finishing almost three seconds behind Thorpe. Meanwhile, U.S. swimmer Klete Keller (another 17-year-old) stormed home from last place in the 200 m lap to wrest a bronze in 3:47.00, an American record, edging out Rosolino's teammate Emiliano Brembilla (3:47.01) by a hundredth of a second (0.01).

Romania's Dragoș Coman finished fifth with a national record of 3:47.38, and was followed in the sixth spot by another U.S. swimmer Chad Carvin in 3:47.58. Aussie Grant Hackett (3:48.22) and South Africa's Ryk Neethling (3:48.52) rounded out the finale within three-tenths of a second (0.30) apart.

Acknowledging a massive roar of the home crowd, Thorpe also cracked Yevgeny Sadovyi's 1992 Olympic record by 0.35 seconds to lead the final of six heats, and pick up a top-seeded time of 3:44.65 in the morning prelims.

Records
Prior to this competition, the existing world and Olympic records were as follows.

The following new world and Olympic records were set during this competition.

Results

Heats

Final

References

External links
Official Olympic Report

F
Men's events at the 2000 Summer Olympics